Actinocrinus is an extinct genus of crinoid from the Early Carboniferous of Europe and North America.

Monobathrida
Carboniferous crinoids
Carboniferous animals of Europe
Mississippian animals of North America